The Nexon Computer Museum is a museum on Jeju Island, South Korea. It opened on July 27, 2013. It is known as one of the first permanent museum in Korea that is dedicated for the history of computer and video games. In 2017, the museum houses 6,900 items including personal computers, video game consoles, arcades, and software. The museum's supporters include institutions such as Computerspielemuseum Berlin and International Center for the History of Electronic Games, and IT companies such as Nexon, Softmax, Gamevil, Oculus VR, Thalmic Labs, Take-Two Interactive, Sony Computer Entertainment, etc. 
The principle of Nexon Co. Ltd.'s museum is to interact and communicate with a range of visitors from across boundaries, by collecting, preserving, researching, exhibiting and educating historic digital artifacts.

General
The Nexon Computer Museum is displaying one of the original Apple I. Purchased from Sotheby's on June 15, 2012 for $374,500, their Apple I is one of only six that are still fully operational. This Apple I successfully operated in 2010 and 2013. A video footage of their year 2013's Apple I operating test was revealed in G-Star 2013, as part of the Nexon Computer Museum's moving exhibition PC Road Show. Their collection also includes the original Altair 8800, Commodore PET, IBM Personal Computer and classic Korean computers such as Zemix V, SPC-1500A, IQ-1000, FC-100D etc. that were developed and/or distributed by Samsung, Daewoo, and Goldstar (now LG). The museum also provides several gaming software available for visitors to play, such as Space Invaders, Galaga, Prince of Persia (1989 video game), Hanme-Type Writing Teacher and various others. It also offers various education programs to local communities.

 1st Floor: Welcome_Stage "Computer as Theatre" - concentrates on the history of personal computers
 2nd Floor: Open_Stage "Between Reality and Fantasy" - concentrates on the history of video games and next-gen technologies
 3rd Floor: Hidden_Stage "The Real Revolution" - concentrates on education programs and open source based inventions
 B1 Floor: Special_Stage "Crazy Arcade" - concentrates on the history of arcade games

Projects
The museum also aims to research and archive MMO games, which is one of the strongest video game genres in South Korea. In 2014, Nexon Computer Museum restored and preserved the earliest (year 1996) version of graphical MMORPG Kingdom of Winds, which is also available to play online. In addition, it provides regional education program such as 'NCM Kids Panel', 'Integrated Kids Workshop HAT', 'Open Workshop', etc.

On June 17, 2015, the museum released its '360 Virtual Museum', which offer a virtual tour of the Nexon Computer Museum's collection.

April 6, 2016, free mobile application 'NCM Mobile Application' was launched for both iOS and Android, which allows users to look for and share pictures and information of 440 major artifacts.

From April to November 2016, Nexon Computer Museum held its first on-going Virtual Reality contents festival ‘2016 NCM VR OPEN CALL’ to raise public interest in Virtual Reality and support new challenges of content creators. Six awardees were chosen among 58 works in various genres including travel, horror, fairy tale and education.
With total 5mln KRW(final amount to be paid after tax) as award, all winners had the opportunity to have Develop Week and Artist Talk program* with independent exhibition in Nexon Computer Museum VR zone. The winners also had a special pop-up museum exhibition at Nexon Korea building at Pan-gyo, South Korea.

On November 3, 2016, Nexon Computer Museum commissioned the winners of 2016 NCM VR OPEN CALL as 2017 NCM Accelerator: VR Project to support further contents development of the artists. Nexon Computer Museum will fund each team from 0.5 to 1 million KRW monthly along with international exhibition, networking and mentoring for a year. Starting from 2016 NCM VR OPEN CALL, Nexon Computer Museum hopes to be a stable companion of the artists to mount new challenges.

History
 Established July 27, 2013.
 Restored the earliest version of graphical MMORPG Kingdom of Winds on May 27, 2014.
 Museum Remark: Keyboard & Mouse exhibition since July 19, 2014.
 360 Virtual Museum since June 17, 2015.
 'NCM Mobile Application' launched April 6, 2016
 '2016 NCM VR OPEN CALL' from April to November, 2016

See also
 Nexon Co. Ltd.

References

External links
  (Korean)
  (English)
 360 Virtual Museum: https://web.archive.org/web/20150703152130/http://www.ncm360.org/

Computer museums
Museums established in 2013
Museums in Jeju Province
Video game culture
Video game museums
2013 establishments in South Korea